Crevillente Deportivo is a Spanish football team based in Crevillent, in the autonomous community of Valencia. Founded in 1967 it plays in Regional Preferente – Group 5, holding home games at Estadio Municipal Enrique Miralles, which has a capacity of 3,500 spectators.

Season to season

22 seasons in Tercera División

References

External links
Official website 
Futbolme team profile 

Football clubs in the Valencian Community
Association football clubs established in 1967
1967 establishments in Spain